Dramatists Play Service (also known as The Play Service) is a theatrical-publishing and licensing house, established in 1936 by members of the Dramatists Guild of America and the Society for Authors' Representatives. DPS publishes English-language acting editions of plays and handles the licensing for professional and nonprofessional English-language productions of these plays in the United States, Canada, and throughout the world.

DPS is based in New York City, with foreign affiliates in London, Australia, South Africa, India, Asia, and South America that serve DPS' interests in their respective regions. The DPS catalogue consists of over 3,300 titles from over 1,300 authors.

DPS authors include Eugene O'Neill, George S. Kaufman, Tennessee Williams, Arthur Miller, Horton Foote, Edward Albee, Sam Shepard, Lanford Wilson, Terrence McNally, Beth Henley, Alfred Uhry, Wendy Wasserstein, Christopher Durang, Paula Vogel, Donald Margulies, Richard Greenberg, John Patrick Shanley, Doug Wright, Tracy Letts, and Frederick Knott.

Broadway Licensing, a musical licensing company, acquired Dramatists Play Service in 2021.

Notes

External links
 Company website

Publishing companies established in 1936
Book publishing companies based in New York (state)
Companies based in New York City
Intellectual property organizations
United States intellectual property law
1936 establishments in New York City
American companies established in 1936